Hocine (variant Houcine) (both derivations of Arabic Hussein, Hussayn) may refer to:

Given name 
Hocine Achiou (born 1979), Algerian football player
Hocine Aït Ahmed (1926–2015), Algerian politician
Hocine Benmiloudi (1955–1981), Algerian football player
Hocine Chebaïki (born 1976), Belgian-Algerian football player
Hocine Fenier (born 1983), Algerian football player
Hocine Gacemi (1974–2000), Algerian football player
Hocine Gherzouli, Algerian Paralympian athlete in shot put events
Hocine Haciane (born 1986), Andorran swimmer 
Hocine Harrouche (born 1987), Algerian football player
Hocine Khalfi (commonly misspelled as "Hoacine", 1928–2011), American boxer
Hocine Metref (born 1984), Algerian football player
Hocine El Orfi (born 1987), Algerian football player
Hocine Ragued (born 1983), French Tunisian football player
Hocine Soltani (1972–2002), Algerian boxer
Hocine Yahi (born 1960), Algerian football player
Hocine Zaourar (born 1952), Algerian photojournalist

Family name 
Chakib Hocine (born 1991), Canadian soccer player
Youssef Hocine (born 1965), French fencer

See also
Beni Hocine, town and commune in Sétif Province in northeastern Algeria
Houcine (disambiguation)
Hussein (disambiguation)